Mahapandit Rahul Sankrityayan Award (Devnagari: महापंडित राहुल सांकृत्यायन पुरस्कार) is a literary honor in India which Kendriya Hindi Sansthan, (Central Hindi Organization), Ministry of Human Resource Development, annually confers on writers of outstanding works in Hindi Travel Literature (यात्रा वृतांत). It is also called Hindi Sevi Samman or Rahul Sankrityayan National Award and is given to number of Hindi experts for playing their important role in promoting the Hindi language..

History
The award was established by Kendriya Hindi Sansthan in 1989 on the name of the Father of Hindi Travel Literature Mahapandit Rahul Sankrityayan. It was first awarded in 1993 to Dr. Kamala Sankrityayan & Dr. Shyam Singh Rashi.

Honour
Mahapandit Rahul Sankrityayan Award is awarded for the Development Travelog & Research and analytical works in Hindi every year by the President Of India.

Award Recipients

External links
 महापंडित राहुल सांकृत्यायन पुरस्कार

Indian literary awards
Awards established in 1993